Markus Böttcher (born 6 July 1964 in Bonn, West Germany) is a German television actor.

External links

ZBF Agency Berlin 

1964 births
Living people
German male television actors
German male film actors
Actors from Bonn
20th-century German male actors